Cocculina messingi is a species of sea snail, deep-sea limpet, a marine gastropod mollusk in the family Cocculinidae.

Distribution
Colombia: Caribbean Sea

Description 
The maximum recorded shell length is 10.9 mm.

Habitat 
Minimum recorded depth is 282 m. Maximum recorded depth is 412 m.

References

External links

Cocculinidae
Gastropods described in 1995